Ateshkadeh-ye Sofla (also Romanized as Āteshkadeh-ye Soflá; also known as Āteshkadeh-ye Pā’īn, Ātashkadeh and Āteshkadeh) is a village in Meyghan Rural District, in the Central District of Nehbandan County, South Khorasan Province, Iran. At the 2006 census, its population was 45, in 11 families.

References 

Populated places in Nehbandan County